The following are the squad lists for the countries that played in the 1923 South American Championship held in Uruguay. The participating countries were Argentina, Brazil, Paraguay and Uruguay. The teams plays in a single round-robin tournament, earning two points for a win, one point for a draw, and zero points for a loss.

Argentina
Head Coach:  Angel Vázquez

Brazil
Head coach:  Chico Netto

Paraguay
Head Coach: n/a

Uruguay
Head Coach:  Leonardo de Luca

Notes

References 

Squads
Copa América squads